Miss Gay may refer to:

Miss Gay America
Miss Gay Philippines

See also
Mr Gay (disambiguation)